Black Earth is a 1923 German silent film directed by Franz Hofer and starring Loni Nest, Fritz Schroeter, and Anna von Palen.

The film's sets were designed by the art director Fritz Willi Krohn.

Cast

References

Bibliography

External links

1923 films
Films of the Weimar Republic
German silent feature films
Films directed by Franz Hofer
German black-and-white films
1920s German films